Peddakondur is a village in the  Choutuppal mandal of Yadadri Bhuvanagiri district in the state of Telangana, India.

Villages in Yadadri Bhuvanagiri district